It's Lonely at the Bottom is Jughead's Revenge's second studio album, released in 1992. This marked the second and last album recorded as a five-piece, as guitarist George Snow left the band to play in the Bad Samaritans full-time. Jughead's Revenge continued as a four-piece, until 1998's Just Joined.

The album was re-released in 1995 by BYO Records along with the band's previous album, Unstuck in Time, as the 28-track compilation It's Lonely at the Bottom/Unstuck in Time.

Track listing

Personnel
 Joe Doherty - vocals
 Joey Rimicci − guitar
 George Snow − guitar
 Brian Preiss − bass
 Nenus Givargus − drums

References

1992 albums
Jughead's Revenge albums